Balázs Balogh (born 21 July 1982) is a Hungarian football player currently playing for FC Ilves.

References
Guardian Football
HLSZ 

1982 births
Living people
Footballers from Budapest
Hungarian footballers
Association football defenders
Nemzeti Bajnokság I players
Veikkausliiga players
Vasas SC players
1. FC Pforzheim players
FC Tatabánya players
Kuopion Palloseura players
Lombard-Pápa TFC footballers
FC Ilves players
Hungarian expatriate footballers
Expatriate footballers in Germany
Hungarian expatriate sportspeople in Germany
Expatriate footballers in Finland
Hungarian expatriate sportspeople in Finland
21st-century Hungarian people